Kim Han-bin (born 31 March 1991) is a South Korean footballer who plays as defender for Pocheon Citizen FC in K3 League.

Career
He was selected by Chungju Hummel in 2014 K League draft.

References

External links 

1991 births
Living people
Association football defenders
South Korean footballers
Chungju Hummel FC players
Bucheon FC 1995 players
Incheon United FC players
K League 2 players
K League 1 players